Mikalai Sharlap (born 30 March 1994) is a Belarusian rower. He won the silver medal in the coxless four at the 2016 European Rowing Championships.

References

External links

Belarusian male rowers
1994 births
Living people
Rowers at the 2016 Summer Olympics
Olympic rowers of Belarus
European Rowing Championships medalists